Visual AIDS is an art organization based in New York City. Started in 1988, it is one of the first initiatives to record the impact of the AIDS pandemic on the artistic community. Art institutions and AIDS-related communities co-developed projects like Day Without Art, Night Without Light, The Banner Project, Postcards from the Edge, and The Ribbon Project. Artists include...

History 
In 1988, New York curators and critics William Olander, Robert Atkins, Thomas Sokolowski, and Gary Garrels (then Director of Programs at Dia Art Foundation), created Visual AIDS, a loosely-organized coalition of arts professionals working to encourage discussion of the pressing social issues of the AIDS epidemic, with artist Patrick O'Connell as their founding executive director. Every year Visual AIDS presents the "Bill Olander Award" to art workers or artists living with HIV.

Activities 
VisualAIDS is helping produce artist projects, organizing exhibitions, public programs and publishing publications. It also runs Artist+ Registry & Archive Associate. In NYC Visual AIDS offers additional services like artwork photography, tours, and Art Therapy Workshops. As of 2013 VisualAIDS is also annually hosting an artist or a curator in residence. In 2020 Visual AIDS launched online platform, “Not Over” featuring rare videos and performances. They also commissioned short videos from different parts of the world that address different experiences of HIV/AIDS for the online program TRANSMISSIONS that premiered on the Day With(out) Art 2020.

Further reading

References

External links
 VisualAIDS's official website

Arts organizations
Non-profit organizations based in New York City
Organizations that support LGBT people
Organizations established in 1988